The Photo Album is the follow up studio album to the critically acclaimed Mirror Music album by hip-hop artist Wordsworth. It features Torae, Range Da Messenger and fellow  members, Masta Ace & Punchline. The album is produced by Apollo Brown, The Are, Tzarism, Frequency, Hezekiah. The Album also features production by South African producers, Thir(13)teen and (Archbishop)

Track listing

Album Chart Positions

Singles Chart Positions

References 

2012 albums
Wordsworth (rapper) albums
Albums produced by Apollo Brown